Gösta Vilhelm Eriksson (19 July 1900 – 7 April 1970) was a Swedish rowing coxswain who competed in the 1920 Summer Olympics.

He was born and died in Vaxholm. In 1920 he was the coxswain of the Swedish boat which was eliminated in the first round of the coxed four event. His elder brother Axel Eriksson competed in the same boat.

References

External links
 Gösta Eriksson's profile at the Swedish Olympic Committee 

1900 births
1970 deaths
Swedish male rowers
Coxswains (rowing)
Olympic rowers of Sweden
Rowers at the 1920 Summer Olympics